Tímea Lőrincz (née Tímea Sára, born 21 April 1992) is a Romanian cross-country skier of ethnic Hungarian descent. She competed at the 2014 Winter Olympics in Sochi, in skiathlon and 10 km classical, and at the 2018 Winter Olympics in Pyeongchang, in sprint classical and 10 km freestyle.

External links

References

1992 births
Living people
Cross-country skiers at the 2014 Winter Olympics
Cross-country skiers at the 2018 Winter Olympics
Cross-country skiers at the 2022 Winter Olympics
Olympic cross-country skiers of Romania
People from Gheorgheni
Romanian sportspeople of Hungarian descent
Romanian female cross-country skiers